National Highway 307 (NH 307) is a short National Highway in Northern India. This  highway links Dehradun in Uttarakhand with Saharanpur on NH 344 in Uttar Pradesh.

See also 
 List of National Highways in India (by Highway Number)
 List of National Highways in India
 National Highways Development Project

References

External links 
NH 307 on OpenStreetMap

307
National Highways in Uttar Pradesh
National highways in India
Transport in Dehradun